Darryl Samson (born 25 August 1952) is a Canadian former international soccer player who played as a midfielder.

After playing college soccer for UBC Thunderbirds, he played at club level for the Vancouver Whitecaps.

He later worked as a high school teacher and counselor, as a therapist, and in drug and alcohol intervention.

References

1952 births
Living people
Association football midfielders
Canadian soccer players
Canada men's international soccer players
North American Soccer League (1968–1984) players
Soccer players from Vancouver
Vancouver Whitecaps (1974–1984) players
UBC Thunderbirds soccer players